Jack McDonald may refer to:

 Jack McDonald (ice hockey, born 1887) (1887–1958), Canadian ice hockey left winger
 Jack McDonald (ice hockey goaltender) (fl. 1946–50), American ice hockey goaltender
 John McDonald (ice hockey) (1921–1990), known as Jack, ice hockey player
 Jack H. McDonald (1932–2022), U.S. Representative from Michigan
 Jack McDonald (baseball) (1844–1880), baseball player
 Jack McDonald (actor) (1880–1962), American actor
 Jack McDonald (American football) (1908–1989), American college football coach for Hofstra University
 Jack McDonald (English footballer) (1921–2007), English footballer with Wolverhampton Wanderers, Bournemouth, Fulham and Southampton
 Jack McDonald (Australian footballer) (born 1930), Australian rules footballer for St Kilda

See also
Jackie McDonald (born 1947), UDA member
John McDonald (disambiguation)
Jack MacDonald (disambiguation)